The Worshipful Company of Farriers is one of the Livery Companies of the City of London. The Farriers, or horseshoe makers, organised in 1356. It received a Royal Charter of incorporation in 1674. Over the years, the Company has evolved from a trade association for horseshoe makers into an organisation for those devoted to equine welfare, including veterinary surgeons.  It also supports general charities, as do other Livery Companies.

The Farriers' Company ranks fifty-fifth in the order of precedence for Livery Companies. Its motto is Vi et Virtute, Latin for By Strength and by Virtue.

Today, the Company is one of the few Livery Companies still to play a formal role in its ancient trade. Section 1 of the Farriers (Registration) Act 1975 enshrined the Farriers' Company with continuing duties outside the traditional City of London jurisdiction that normally applies to livery companies.  It provided, "The Worshipful Company of Farriers (hereinafter referred to as “the Company”) shall have the general function of securing adequate standards of competence and conduct among persons engaged in the shoeing of horses (hereinafter referred to as “farriers”) and shall promote, encourage and advance the art and science of farriery and education in connection with the said art and science".

Past Masters 
The Master of the Company serves for one year. The annual installation of a new Master for the Worshipful Company of Farriers takes place in September.

References

External links
 The Farriers' Company

Farriers
Horseshoes